Charlotte Buck (born February 15, 1995) is an American rower. She competed at the 2020 Summer Olympics in the women's eight event. Buck is from Nyack, New York, and graduated from Nyack High School before attending Columbia University.

References

External links
 
 
 
 

1995 births
Living people
American female rowers
Rowers at the 2020 Summer Olympics
People from Nyack, New York
World Rowing Championships medalists for the United States
Columbia Lions rowers
Olympic rowers of the United States
21st-century American women